Honkey Kong is a 2011 solo album by Eagles of Death Metal front man Jesse Hughes, under the pseudonym Boots Electric on Dangerbird Records. The album was released in September 2011, with the band playing their first live show one month prior. "Oh Girl", "Complexity" and "I Love You All the Thyme" were later reworked and released on Eagles of Death Metal's 2015 album Zipper Down (with the latter renamed "I Love You All the Time").

Track listing 
 "Complexity"
 "I Love You All the Thyme"
 "Boots Electric Theme" (backing vocals by Brody Dalle)
 "Dreams Tonight"
 "No Ffun"
 "Oh....Girl!"
 "Speed Demon"
 "You'll Be Sorry"
 "Trippy Blob"
 "Swallowed By the Night"

Personnel 
 Boots Electric - vocals, guitars, bass, synths, keyboards, production, engineering, art and layout
 Money Mark - organ, piano, backing vocals, guitar, synthesizer, keyboards, key bass, circus organ, Wurlitzer piano, vocals, drums, production, engineering
 Roger Joseph Manning, Jr. - synthesizers
 Tony Hoffer - synths, programming, keyboards, production, mixing, engineering
 Liela Moss - vocals
 Brian LeBarton - magical synth, synthesizer, keyboards
 Norm Block -  drums
 Brody Dalle-Homme - vocals (on "Boots Electric Theme" )
 Joey Castillo - drums
 Joshua Homme - guitar
 Troy Van Leeuwen - guitars
 Claude Coleman, Jr. - guitars, drums
 Chris Reynolds - drum programming, drums, co-produced, engineered, steered, speared and made weird
 Lizette Cardenaz - guitar, bass, piano
 Omar Cabral - vocals
 Juliette Lewis - vocals (on "Boots Electric Theme")
 Howard Jones - vocals
 Jessy Greene - fiddle

Reviews 
mxdwn.com gave Honkey Kong a generally favorable review, saying "Despite what Hughes and fellow Eagles of Death Metal member have gone through in the past, the guy still manages to push fresh, exciting, music that sounds simply…effortless. When you’re pushing 40, maybe all you need is a 4/4 beat and a couple fun, life-assuring chords.". rocksound.tv had a mostly positive review, saying, "A blend of electronic beats, keyboard-heavy dance grooves and hip-shaking pop underpinned by distorted guitar lines, this is funky and enjoyable stuff. ‘Speed Demon’ sees his rock ‘n’ roll roots in full blossom, though things take a turn for the worse when he tries his hand at electro-baladry on ‘No Fun’."

References

External links 
 Official Website
 
 

2011 albums
Dangerbird Records albums
Jesse Hughes (musician) albums